Geoffrey McGeachin (born 1949 in Melbourne, Victoria) is an Australian photographer and author of crime fiction.  He spent a period of time in the US in the 1970s as a commercial photographer, before returning to Melbourne where he now lives.

McGeachin is one of only four writers who have won the Best Novel category at the Ned Kelly Awards on multiple occasions; the others being Garry Disher, Michael Robotham and Peter Temple.

Awards 
 2011, Ned Kelly Awards for Crime Writing, Best Novel: winner for The Diggers Rest Hotel
 2013, Ned Kelly Awards for Crime Writing, Best Novel: winner for Blackwattle Creek

Note: references are provided on the individual Award pages.

Bibliography

Novels
Standalone works
Fat, Fifty and F**ked! (2004)

Alby Murdoch series

A humorous spy thriller series, focusing on Australian special agent Alby Murdoch.
D-E-D Dead! (2005)
Sensitive New Age Spy (2007)
Dead and Kicking (2009)

Charlie Berlin series

Focuses on police officer and WWII veteran Charlie Berlin. Each book is set a decade apart, with the first novel being set in 1947, and the third in 1967.
The Diggers Rest Hotel (2010)
Blackwattle Creek (2012)
St Kilda Blues (2014)

References

External links
Author's website

1949 births
Living people
21st-century Australian novelists
Australian crime writers
Australian male novelists
Australian poets
Ned Kelly Award winners
Australian male poets
21st-century Australian male writers